The 1967 Princeton Tigers football team was an American football team that represented Princeton University during the 1967 NCAA University Division football season. After gaining a share of the Ivy League crown the previous year, Princeton fell to a fourth-place tie in 1967.

In their eleventh year under head coach Dick Colman, the Tigers compiled a 6–3 record and outscored opponents 233 to 162. Elam M. (Lee) Hitchner III was the team captain.

Princeton's 4–3 conference record tied for fourth place in the Ivy League standings. The Tigers outscored Ivy opponents 183 to 141. 

Princeton played its home games at Palmer Stadium on the university campus in Princeton, New Jersey.

Schedule

References

Princeton
Princeton Tigers football seasons
Princeton Tigers football